Marko Jovanović (born 21 October 1978) is a Serbian former professional footballer who played as a forward.

Career
Jovanović spent five seasons with Vojvodina from 2001 to 2006, making 95 appearances and scoring 20 goals in the First League of Serbia and Montenegro. He also played abroad in China, Poland, Ukraine, Romania and Albania.

In November 2014, Jovanović was appointed as sporting director of Radnički Niš. He was dismissed from the position in August 2018 for undisclosed reasons. However, three months later, Jovanović was reappointed as sporting director of Radnički Niš.

References

External links
 
 
 
 
 

Kategoria Superiore players
Association football forwards
Chinese Super League players
Ekstraklasa players
Expatriate footballers in Albania
Expatriate footballers in China
Expatriate footballers in Poland
Expatriate footballers in Romania
Expatriate footballers in Ukraine
FC CFR Timișoara players
FC Chornomorets Odesa players
First League of Serbia and Montenegro players
FK Banat Zrenjanin players
FK Hajduk Kula players
RFK Novi Sad 1921 players
FK Proleter Novi Sad players
FK Vojvodina players
FK Zvezdara players
KF Vllaznia Shkodër players
KF Bylis Ballsh players
Liga II players
Serbia and Montenegro expatriate footballers
Serbia and Montenegro expatriate sportspeople in China
Serbia and Montenegro footballers
Serbian expatriate footballers
Serbian expatriate sportspeople in Albania
Serbian expatriate sportspeople in Poland
Serbian expatriate sportspeople in Romania
Serbian expatriate sportspeople in Ukraine
Serbian First League players
Serbian footballers
Serbian SuperLiga players
Sichuan Guancheng players
Sportspeople from Niš
Ukrainian Premier League players
Zagłębie Lubin players
1978 births
Living people